Radio transmission in Paris began in 1921, and today there are many AM and FM radio stations available to listeners in Paris and the Île-de-France region.

History
The first radio broadcast in Paris aimed at the general public took place on 24 December 1921. The next year, the French government allowed the establishment of the first private radio station in Paris: Radiola.

After the Second World War, Parisian radio was nationalized, and it was not until 1981, following the election of François Mitterrand that private companies were able easily to broadcast in the Paris area. Mitterrand was attempting to permit the growth of radio stations through privatization and fewer regulations, following the Italian example (in 1977, the Italian government permitted the establishment of private stations, leading to a boom in the number of stations). In the early 1980s, there were more than 200 radio stations in Paris. These stations often overlapped, broadcast only sporadically and often low-quality content. This chaotic situation came to an end after the establishment of several regulatory agencies — first the Haute Autorité, then the CNCL, and finally the Conseil Supérieur de l'Audiovisuel which granted licences to operate on specific frequencies to certain companies.

The first radio stations in Paris (chronological)

 Radio Tour Eiffel (general interest; state radio) 24 December 1921-June 1940. At the start, it broadcast only for a half-hour a day: a weather forecast, a review of the press and music. The first news broadcast took place on it 3 November 1925. 
 Radiola (general interest; private) 6 November 1922 to 28 March 1924. Radiola's first trials took place on 26 June 1922 and its first regular broadcasts began on 6 November 1922. Marcel Laporte provided the most-frequently-heard voice for the station. Its first news broadcasts took place on 6 January 1923. It became Radio Paris on 29 March 1924 (general interest ; private, then state-run on 17 December 1933) 29 March 1924–17 June 1940. It kept its name of Radio Paris from July 1940 until August 1944, but the station was then run by Nazis and French collaborators.
 Radio PTT (general interest; state-run) 20 January 1923 until June 1940.
 Poste Parisien (general interest; private) from 30 March 1924 to June 1940.
 Radio LL (general interest; private) from March 1926 until 28 September 1935. It became Radio Cité (general interest; private) from 29 September 1935 until June 1940.
 Radio Vitus (general interest; private) from 1 December 1926 until 14 January 1934. It became Poste de l’Ile de France (general interest; private) from 15 January 1934 until June 1940
 Radio Luxembourg (general interest, private) from 15 March 1933 until 21 September 1939, and was resurrected from 1945 to 1966, before becoming RTL (general interest) since 1966
 Radio 37 (general interest; private) from 5 September 1937 to 13 June 1940
 Poste colonial (general interest, directed towards the French colonies ; state radio) from 30 April 1931 until 1 March 1938. It became Paris Mondial (general interest, directed towards French colonies, in 20 languages ; state radio) from 2 March 1938 until 17 June 1940.

From Public Service to Pirate Radio (non-exhaustive chronological list)

 Paris Inter, then RTF Inter (general interest, state-run) from 1947 to 1963. Became France Inter (general interest, state-run) from 1963 on.
 Europe 1 (general interest, private) from 1955 on.
 France Musique (music, public service) from 1963
 France Culture (culture, public service), since 1963
 FIP (music, public service) since 1971
 RFI (news and information, public service — similar to the BBC and NPR) since 6 January 1975
 Radio Verte (green/ecological/pirate) from 1977 until 1981
 Radio Ivre (drunk radio) (pirate) from 1979 until 1981
 Radio 7 (music, public service) from 1980 until 1987
 Ici et Maintenant (here and now) (political/socialist) from 21 June 1980 (was pirate at the start) until 5 September 1996
 Radio Carbone 14 from 1981 until 1983. It was here that Jean-Yves Lafesse and "Supernana" débuted.

From free-form to formats (non-exhaustive chronological list) 
 Nova (general interest, FM), from 25 May 1981 on.
 Ado FM (local, then musical) from 1981, changed to a commercial station run by Start (Vibration), and now plays R&B.
 Radio Libertaire (anarchist) since 1981.
 Radio Notre-Dame (catholic) since 1981.
 RFM (music) since May 1981, was independent, then owned by the British firm Crown, then groupe Lagardère.
 NRJ (music) since 1981.
 Radio FG (originally serving the gay community, it has now somewhat walked away from that angle. Today it is classified as a mostly techno/house radio) since 1981 (Trivia: FG stands for Fréquence Gay).
 Radio Montmartre (French music) from 1981 until 11 July 1995. Became Montmartre FM (French music) from 11 July 1995 until 1998, then became MFM (French music) since 1998.
 La voix du Lézard (modern rock) from 1982 to 1986. Became Skyrock (top 40, then top 40/rap) since 1986
 Radio Classique (classical) since January 1983.
 Nostalgie (oldies) since 1986
 France Info (news, public service) since 1 June 1987.
 Electric FM (?; owned by de Bouygues); since 1987.
  (rock) from 1981 to 1987. 
 Ca bouge dans ma tête (world) from 1985 to 1987. Became Ouï FM (alternative rock) SINCE 1987.
 Hit FM (?) from 1 January 1985 to 11 mars 1988. Became Europe 2  (Adult contemporary, sister station to Europe 1) from January 1987 until 12 mars 1988, at which point it became Hit FM once again).
 CFM (General interest FM, sister station of Europe 1) from 15 April 1985 to 30 May 1986. Broadcasts some news shows produced by Europe 1.
 Gilda (General interest FM) from 1981 until 1987. Became Chérie FM (Music and news; owned by NRJ) in 1987.
 Paris Jazz (jazz) since 1987. Merger of "Génération" and "Paris Jazz sur Paris".
 Pacific FM (music) from July 1987 until 13 November 1989 (became Rire et Chansons, (music and sketches ; owned by NRJ) from 14 November 1989 on.
 Chic FM (music) from January 1986 until 2 September 1987 Became FUN (top 40) in 1987.
 95.2 (music) from 1983 until 1987. Became KISS FM (General interest FM) from 30 avril 1987 until October 1990 ; Frequency shared since April 2001 by Ici et Maintenant and Radio Néo
 Muppies FM (children's radio) began as pirate in 1987, later became Superloustic (children's radio) from May 1987 until September 1987. Restarted in 2004 as an AM station.
 Radio Eglantine (Portuguese) from the 1980s until the 1990s.
 KWFM (rock) from September 1989 until October 1990, following California FM [not the US station from Tucson, AZ].
 Aventure FM (owned by the French Army) from December 1987 until 1989. Became Maxximum (dance ; owned by RTL) from 23 October 1989 to 5 January 1992. Became M40 (top 40 ; owned by RTL) from 6 January 1992 until 18 January 1995. Became RTL 1 (top 40; owned by RTL) from 19 January 1995, then became RTL 2 (pop-rock ; owned by RTL) from 1995 on.
 BFM (news) since 1992.
 Bizz FM (Music) from November 1992 to 31 December 1993. Station belonged to Eddie Barclay. Became Chante France (French music) since le 1 January 1994.
 Le Mouv' (soft rock, public service) since 8 December 2001.
 Radio Néo (New artists) since 2001.

Broadcasters in the banlieue
 IDFM (Val d'Oise) since 1982, initially Radio-Enghien.
 CVS (Hauts de Seine) from 1981 until September 1990. Became O'FM from September 1990 until 1998. Became Sport O’FM in 1998, then Sport FM since 2002.
 Radio Caroline, Daniel Guichard and his Radio-Bocal (both in Nanterre), and RSRM. (Rueil-Malmaison) broadcast locally a few years at the start of the 1980s.
 TSF radio du jazz (communist, then jazz) since 1981, broadcast successively from Nanterre then from Bobigny.
 MBS, Daniel Gérard, (92.8) country music and American music.

Current FM  band in Paris 
87,8 : France Inter
88,2 : Générations
88,6 : Radio soleil
89,0 : Radio France Internationale
89,4 : Radio libertaire
89,9 : TSF Jazz
90,4 : Nostalgie 
90,9 : Chante France
91,3 : Chérie FM 
91,7 : France Musique
92,1 : Le Mouv'
92,6 : Tropiques FM
92,8 : Music Box
93,1 : Radio pays / Aligre FM
93,5 : France Culture
93,9 : Radio Campus Paris / Vivre FM
94,3 : Radio Orient
94,8 : Radio J / Judaïques FM / RCJ / Radio Shalom
95,2 : Ici et Maintenant / Radio Néo
95,6 : Radio courtoisie
96,0 : Skyrock
96,4 : BFM Business
96,9 : Voltage
97,4 : Rire et Chansons
97,8 : Ado FM
98,2 : Radio FG
98,6 : Radio Alfa
98,8 : Radio Espace FM
99,0 : Radio Latina
99,5 : France Maghreb / AYP FM
99,9 : Sud Radio
100,3 : NRJ
100,7 : Radio Notre Dame / Fréquence protestante
101,1 : Radio Classique
101,5 : Radio Nova
101,9 : FUN Radio
102,3 : Ouï FM
102,7 : MFM
103,1 : RMC Info
103,5 : Virgin Radio
103,9 : RFM
104,3 : RTL
104,7 : Europe 1
105,1 : FIP
105,5 : France Info
105,9 : RTL 2
106,3 : Fréquence Paris plurielle
106,7 : Beur FM
107,1 : France Bleu Ile de France
107,5 : Africa n°1
107,7 : Autoroute FM
107,7 : 107,9 : Vent d'Ouest (pirate) (not regular) / Radio Plus (pirate) (not regular)

See also
 Radiodiffusion-Télévision Française
 Office de Radiodiffusion Télévision Française

External links
 Radio stations in Paris (Radiomap.eu)
 List of Radio Stations in Paris
 Radios in Paris

 
Lists of radio stations